George Yule may refer to:
 George Yule (businessman) (1829–1892), Scottish merchant and politician in India
 George Yule (linguist) (born 1947), British linguist
 George Udny Yule (1871–1951), British statistician